Atlı (literally "equestrian", "horseman" or "rider") is a Turkish surname and may refer to:
 Aşir Atlı (1881–1957), officer of the Ottoman and general of the Turkish Army
 İsmet Atlı (1931–2014), Turkish wrestler
 Mert Atlı (born 1993), Turkish racewalker
 Süleyman Atlı (born 1994), Turkish wrestler 
 Atlı, Olur

References

Turkish-language surnames